Calosoma oberthuri is a species of ground beetle in the subfamily of Carabinae. It was described by Vuillet in 1910.

References

oberthuri
Beetles described in 1910